Robert Blackburn may refer to:

 Robert Blackburn (artist) (1920–2003), African-American artist, teacher and printmaker
 Robert Blackburn (aviation pioneer) (1885–1955), British aviation pioneer, founder of Blackburn Aircraft
 Robert Blackburn (educationalist) (1927–1990), Irish educationist and IBO Deputy Director General
 Robert Blackburn (politician) (1828–1894), Canadian politician
 Robert E. Blackburn (born 1950), U.S. federal judge
 Robert E. Lee Blackburn (1870–1935), U.S. Representative from Kentucky
 Robert McGrady Blackburn (1919–2002), American Bishop of the United Methodist Church
 Bob Blackburn (announcer) (1924–2010), American play-by-play announcer
 Bob Blackburn (ice hockey) (1938–2016), Canadian ice hockey player
 Robert Blackburn (footballer) (1885–?), Scottish football player and manager
Robert C. Blackburn, political scientist and state senator who lived in Dayton, Ohio
 Robert H. Blackburn (1919–2019), Chief Librarian, University of Toronto, 1954–1981
 Robert Blackburn (lawyer) (born 1952), English professor of constitutional law at King's College London

See also
 Robert Blackburne, English Catholic plotter